, best known by the pen name , is a Japanese manga artist whose work spans multiple genres and appeals to diverse audiences.

Biography
Before becoming a manga artist, Asamiya graduated from the Tokyo Designer School, then worked as a character designer for a number of anime series, and even designed models for some of the later Godzilla films (1980s). For this career, he used his real name, and maintained the two professional identities separately for many years. Several of the anime series that he worked on were very popular inside and outside Japan, most notably Sonic Soldier Borgman and Project A-ko. Even after focusing primarily on his manga career, Asamiya continued to do character designs and creative consultation on anime series based on his stories, occasionally under the Kikuchi name.

In the early 2000s, Asamiya shifted his focus from teenage and young-adult stories to stories designed for children and for an American audience. In the former case, he credits his children as a motivation but, in the latter case, he points to a long-standing desire to work with his favorite American characters. To that end, he has worked on projects with Image Comics, Marvel Comics, and DC Comics, as well as developing a manga adaptation of the film Star Wars: Episode I – The Phantom Menace.

He is well known for using influences from American comics, television, and films in his work, and describes himself as a big fan of Batman and Star Wars. One of the most widely published Japanese manga artist, nearly all of his stories have been translated into other languages, including English. His two most successful and popular manga series to-date are Martian Successor Nadesico and Silent Möbius.

While many Japanese artists (and artists in general) are quite reclusive, Asamiya often makes an effort to be available to his fans. He maintains a website with news and information about his studio, TRON (named after the Disney film Tron). He aids and assists his official fan club by sending them regular announcements and limited-edition merchandise. Despite these actions, he shunned all public photography and had the habit of depicting himself with a placeholder sign for a face. It has become a trademark feature of his books that instead of a picture of the artist, there is an elaborately decorated rectangle sporting the words "Now Printing" (a message used in Japan for placeholder images).

Works

Manga

 Shin Seiki Vagrants (1986–1988)
 Silent Möbius (1989–1999)
 Silent Möbius Klein (1994)—prequel
 Silent Möbius Tales (2003)
 Silent Möbius QD (2013–2018)
 Gunhed (1990)—adaptation of the film
 Compiler (1991–1993)
 Assembler 0X (1992)
 Dark Angel (1992–1997)
 Dark Angel: Phoenix Resurrection (2001–2002)
 Steam Detectives (1994–2000)
 New Steam Detectives (2001–2003)
 Martian Successor Nadesico (1996–1999)
 Corrector Yui (1999–2000)
 Star Wars: Episode I – The Phantom Menace (1999)—adaptation of the film
 Batman: Child of Dreams (2000–2001)
 Gacha Gacha Family Ebiru-Kun  (2000–2001)
 D-Divine (2001)
 Color Pri (2004)
 Junk: Record of the Last Hero (2004–2007)
 My Favorite Carrera (2004–2012)
 Kanojo no Carrera RS (2013–2015)
 Zero Angel -Sōheki no Datenshi (2016–2018)
  (2019–)

Other comics
 Detonator Orgun (character design: as Michitaka Kikuchi)
 "Hellboy: Toy Soldier" from Hellboy: Weird Tales issue #8
 Kamen Rider Fourze (Zodiarts design)
 Sonic Soldier Borgman (character design: as Michitaka Kikuchi)
 White Diamond (game designs for main characters)
 Uncanny X-Men
 Xenoblade Chronicles 2 (Vess/Musubi character design)

Video game intros
 Crash Fever (Malthus)

References

External links
 Kia Asamiya and Michitaka Kikuchi's Official Web Site
 
 
 Kia Asamiya on marvel.com
 

 
1963 births
20th-century Japanese artists
21st-century Japanese artists
Anime character designers
Japanese animators
Japanese graphic novelists
Living people
Manga artists from Iwate Prefecture